Kawabuchi (written:  or ) is a Japanese surname. Notable people with the surname include:

, Japanese ice hockey player
, Japanese politician
, Japanese footballer and manager
, Japanese ice hockey player, coach and administrator

Japanese-language surnames